Pioneer is a 2013 Norwegian thriller film directed by Erik Skjoldbjærg. It was released on 30 August, followed by a screening in the Special Presentation section at the 2013 Toronto International Film Festival.

Plot
Petter is a commercial offshore diver in the North Sea during the 1980s. Norway is at the beginning of its program for oil harvesting. Petter and his brother Knut have key roles in laying the first petroleum pipe in the North Sea. Norwegians and Americans are cooperating in diving deeper than anyone previously has done, to prepare for the installation of a gas pipeline. Petter experiences a tragic accident during a test dive. When he later tries to find out what really happened, he finds that the authorities and his colleagues are trying to cover up the matter.

Cast

 Aksel Hennie as Petter Jensen
 Wes Bentley as Mike
 Stephen Lang as John Ferris
 Jonathan LaPaglia as Dr. Ronald McDermott
 Stephanie Sigman as Maria Salazar
 Jørgen Langhelle as Leif Lindberg
 Ane Dahl Torp as Pia
 André Eriksen as Knut Jensen
 Arne Lindtner Næss as Minister
 Eirik Stubø as Ivar Jeger
 Endre Hellestveit as Trond
 Janne Heltberg as Trude Svendsen
 Kent Albinsson as Jens Roger Hjort

Reception
On Rotten Tomatoes, the film has an approval rating of 55% based on 44 reviews, with an average rating of 5.6/10. The website's critics consensus reads: "Pioneer boasts strong acting and a throwback conspiracy thriller vibe, but fails to take it far enough -- and is very slow about not getting there." On Metacritic, the film has a score of 58 out of 100, based on reviews from 13 critics.

English-language remake
, Smokehouse Pictures, run by producing partners George Clooney and Grant Heslov, are working on an English-language remake of the film.

See also
 The drilling rig Byford Dolphin, where a real-life decompression chamber accident in Norway resulted in the death of a number of divers in 1983.

References

External links
 
 
 
 

2013 films
2013 thriller films
Norwegian thriller films
French thriller films
German thriller films
Swedish thriller films
2010s Norwegian-language films
Films directed by Erik Skjoldbjærg
Films set in Norway
Films shot in Norway
Norwegian independent films
French independent films
German independent films
Swedish independent films
Underwater action films
Polish thriller films
2013 independent films
Films set in the 1980s
2010s French films
2010s German films
2010s Swedish films